The 2019 Brown Bears football team represented Brown University in the 2019 NCAA Division I FCS football season. They were led by first-year head coach James Perry and played their home games at Brown Stadium. They were a member of the Ivy League. They finished the season 2–8, 1–6 in Ivy League play to finish in last place. Brown averaged 3,789 fans per game a 7.85% decrease from last year.

Previous season

The Bears finished the 2018 season 1–9, 0–7 in Ivy League play to finish in last place.

Preseason

Preseason media poll
The Ivy League released their preseason media poll on August 8, 2019. The Bears were picked to finish in eighth place.

Schedule

Roster

Game summaries

at Bryant

at Harvard

Rhode Island

Holy Cross

Princeton

at Cornell

at Penn

Yale

at Columbia

Dartmouth

References

Brown
Brown Bears football seasons
Brown Bears football